Maryanne Wolf is a scholar, teacher, and advocate for children and literacy around the world. She is the UCLA Professor-in-Residence of Education, Director of the UCLA Center for Dyslexia, Diverse Learners, and Social Justice, and the Chapman University Presidential Fellow (2018-2022). She is also the former John DiBiaggio Professor of Citizenship and Public Service, Director of the Center for Reading and Language Research, and Professor in the Eliot-Pearson Department of Child Study and Human Development at Tufts University. She is a permanent academician in the Pontifical Academy of Science. She was recently made an Honorary Advisory Fellow on the United Sigma Intelligence Association.

Education and work 
She completed her doctorate at Harvard University, in the Department of Human Development and Psychology in the Graduate School of Education, where she began her work in cognitive neuroscience and developmental psycholinguistics on the reading brain, literacy development, and dyslexia. She received her undergraduate and master's degrees in literature from Saint Mary's College (Indiana) and from Northwestern University.

Her work revolves around the study of development of the reading brain and the major impediments to its development, from genetically based dyslexia to environmentally based illiteracy. For the last two decades she has employed research in cognitive neuroscience, psycholinguistics, child development, and education to construct developmental models of the reading brain circuitry and the multiple component processes that are necessary for its acquisition. She proposed an alternative conceptualization of dyslexia which emphasizes the potential of multiple sources of breakdown, rather than previous, unidimensional explanations for dyslexia. Such a conceptualization became the basis for diagnostic tools that could pinpoint subtypes of struggling readers, and the development of more differential intervention for these children.

Within literacy areas, she has served on the Library of Congress Advisory Committee on Literacy Awards, and the Advisory Committee to the X Prize, whose new award will target Global Literacy, based in part on the recent work on literacy by her joint team in Ethiopia. With pediatric neurologist Martha Bridge Dencla she has published the RAN-RAS test for measuring naming speed, one of the best predictors of dyslexia across all languages. Funded by the National Institute for Child Health and Human Development, she created the RAVE-O intervention program for children with dyslexia and beginning readers. She was a Fellow (2014-2015) and Research Affiliate (2016-2017) at the  Center for Advanced Study in the Behavioral Sciences at Stanford University, and currently serves on its advisory board. She serves also on the boards of Cox Campus and the new Centre for the Study of the History of Reading.

She is currently working with members of the Dyslexia Center in the UCSF School of Medicine, as well as with the faculty at Chapman University on issues related to dyslexia and illiteracy in vulnerable populations and prisons. She served as an External Advisor to the International Monetary Fund, a research advisor to the Canadian Children's Literacy Foundation. She is a board member of the Dyslexia Foundation. She was recently elected a member of the Pontifical Academy of Science.

Awards 
Selected awards include Distinguished Professor of the Year from the Massachusetts Psychological Association; the Teaching Excellence Award for Universities from the American Psychological Association. For her work in dyslexia she has received the Alice Ansara Award, the Norman Geschwind Lecture Award, and Samuel Orton Award. For her research she has received the NICHD Shannon Award for Innovative Research, which resulted in the RAVE-O reading intervention program; the Distinguished Researcher Award; the Fulbright Research Fellowship for work on dyslexia in Germany;  the Christopher Columbus Award for intellectual discovery for her most recent work in Ethiopia and South Africa on the development of a digital learning experience that will bring literacy to children in remote regions of the world; the 2016 Australian Journal of Learning Difficulties Eminent Researcher from Learning Difficulties Australia; and the Dyslexia Research Hero award by Windward School in New York. Recently, she received The Dyslexia Foundation's Einstein Award, the national award from the Reading League for her contributions on reading research and the Walter Ong Award for Career Achievement in Scholarship for her work on the effects of different mediums on the intellectual development of the species. Dr. Wolf has received several honorary doctorates.

Publications 
(Edited by Maryanne Wolf, Mark K. McQuillan, Eugene Radwin.) Thought & Language/Language & Reading. Reprint Series 14. Cambridge: Harvard Educational Review, 1980. 
(Edited by Maryanne Wolf.) Dyslexia, Fluency, and the Brain. Timonium, Md.: York Press, 2001. , OCLC 46975014
  15 Translations.  
  with co-author Stephanie Gottwald
 Reader Come Home: The Reading Brain in a Digital World. New York: HarperCollins, 2018. 11 Translations. . 
Over 170 scientific publications

References

External links 
 Relationships and Reading Readiness-- Cox Campus Townhall
Falling Walls Conference, Berlin
Skim Reading is The New Normal
Screen-based online learning will change kids' brains. Are we ready for that?
Will too much screen time hurt our children's brains?
Oh, The Places They'll Go? Reading in a Digital World
The Coming Literacy Crisis
Deep Comprehension and Digital Texts

 Dr. Maryanne Wolf at the 2017 Burnett Seminar at UNC-Chapel Hill
 Tufts Faculty Profile
 Children of the Code interview
 Dear Reader: PW Talks with Maryanne Wolf, Publishers Weekly
 Reader Come Home Book Study

American educators
Living people
Harvard Graduate School of Education alumni
1950 births